Cui Puzhen (1907–1961) was a Chinese educator and politician. She was among the first group of women elected to the Legislative Yuan in 1948.

Biography
Cui was born in 1907 and was originally from Qingyuan in Hebei province. She taught at Beiping Beiman Girls' Middle School and became headmistress of Chunan Women's Vocational School. She also served as secretary of the Hubei provincial branch of the Kuomintang.

Cui was a Kuomintang candidate in Hebei in the 1948 elections for the Legislative Yuan and was elected to parliament. She relocated to Taiwan during the Chinese Civil War, where she attended the Institute of Revolutionary Practice. She remained a member of the Legislative Yuan until her death in 1961.

References

1907 births
National Chengchi University alumni
Chinese schoolteachers
Members of the Kuomintang
20th-century Chinese women politicians
Members of the 1st Legislative Yuan
Members of the 1st Legislative Yuan in Taiwan
1961 deaths